Jacques Abardonado (born 27 May 1978) is a French former footballer who played as a defender.

Personal life
Abardonado is of Spanish Romani descent through his father. His cousin is the French footballer André-Pierre Gignac.

References

External links 

1978 births
Living people
Footballers from Marseille
Association football defenders
French footballers
French people of Spanish descent
French people of Romani descent
French expatriate footballers
Olympique de Marseille players
FC Lorient players
OGC Nice players
1. FC Nürnberg players
Valenciennes FC players
Grenoble Foot 38 players
ÉFC Fréjus Saint-Raphaël players
Ligue 1 players
Ligue 2 players
Bundesliga players
2. Bundesliga players
Expatriate footballers in Germany
French expatriate sportspeople in Germany
Romani footballers